The 2006 Alabama gubernatorial election occurred on November 7, 2006. Incumbent Republican Bob Riley defeated Democratic Lieutenant Governor Lucy Baxley. Riley garnered 21% of African Americans' votes.

Primary elections

Republican Party
Bob Riley, incumbent Governor of Alabama
Roy Moore, former Chief Justice of the Alabama Supreme Court

Polling

Results

Democratic Party
Lucy Baxley, Lieutenant Governor
Don Siegelman, former Governor
Joe Copeland, teacher
Nathan Mathis, former State Representative
Katherine Mack, minister
James Potts, financial advisor
Harry Lyon, perennial candidate

Polling

Results

General election

Candidates
 Bob Riley (Republican), incumbent Governor of Alabama
 Lucy Baxley (Democratic), Lieutenant Governor of Alabama, former Alabama State Treasurer
 Loretta Nall (Libertarian; write-in), founder of the United States Marijuana Party
 Nathan Mathis (write-in), former State Representative
 Michael A. Polemeni (write-in), Huntsville/Madison County Chapter President of Alabama Family Rights Association

Predictions

Polling

Results

See also
2006 United States gubernatorial elections
State of Alabama
Governors of Alabama

References

External links
Alabama Secretary of State 2006 Election Information
Official campaign websites (archived)
Bob Riley for Governor
Loretta Nall for Governor
Don Siegelman for Governor
Roy Moore for Governor

See also

Governor
2006
Alabama